Žarošice is a municipality and village in Hodonín District in the South Moravian Region of the Czech Republic. It has about 1,100 inhabitants.

Administrative parts
Villages of Silničná and Zdravá Voda are administrative parts of Žarošice.

References

Villages in Hodonín District
Moravian Slovakia